This was the first edition of the event.

Twenty-year-old British player Kyle Edmund won the tournament, defeating Tatsuma Ito in the final, 6–1, 6–2.

Seeds

Draw

Finals

Top half

Bottom half

References
 Main Draw
 Qualifying Draw

Hong Kong ATP Challenger - Singles
2015 Singles